Puntius layardi is a species of ray-finned fish in the genus Puntius. It is found in Sri Lanka.

References 

Puntius
Fish described in 1868
Taxa named by Albert Günther
Fish of Sri Lanka